The 2018 Hero Super Cup was the inaugural edition of the Super Cup and 39th season of the main club knockout football competition in India. The competition is sponsored by Hero MotoCorp and is officially known as the Hero Super Cup. The competition began with the qualifiers on 15 March 2018 and concluded with the final on 20 April 2018. The entire tournament took place in the Kalinga Stadium, Bhubaneswar.

The competition features teams from both the I-League and Indian Super League. Both leagues containing 10 teams each, the top six teams from both qualified for the tournament automatically while the bottom four sides contested in the qualifiers. The Super Cup replaces the Federation Cup, which was considered the top knockout competition before this tournament.

Teams
A total of 16 teams are participating in the competition proper. The top six teams from both the I-League and Indian Super League qualified for the Super Cup automatically while the bottom four sides have participated in the qualifiers.

Round dates
On 12 March 2018, the All India Football Federation announced the schedule and full format of the tournament. Due to the participation of Aizawl and Bengaluru in the AFC Cup, the schedule for the quarter-finals shall be decided at a later date.

Bracket

Qualification round
After the conclusion of the I-League and Indian Super League seasons, the All India Football Federation announced the draw for the qualification round of the Super Cup.

Round of 16
The All India Football Federation announced the draw for the round of 16 of the competition on 12 March 2018.

Quarter-finals
The dates for the quarter-final matches were scheduled to be announced at a later date to accommodate AFC Cup commitments of Aizawl and Bengaluru. After Aizawl and Bengaluru advanced to the quarter-finals, the following fixtures were confirmed for the quarter-finals. During the game between Jamshedpur FC and FC Goa, six players (three each from both the teams) were sent off at the half-time for violent conduct. In the games against NEROCA F.C., Sunil Chhetri scored the first hat-trick of the tournament.

Semi-finals
The semi-finals were played on 16 April and 17 April 2018 at the Kalinga Stadium.

Final

The final was played on 20 April 2018 at the Kalinga Stadium and Bengaluru won the inaugural Super Cup by defeating East Bengal in the final.

Goalscorers
6 goals
  Sunil Chhetri (Bengaluru)

5 goals
  Miku (Bengaluru)

4 goals
  Aser Pierrick Dipanda (Mohun Bagan)

3 goals
  Hugo Boumous (Goa)

2 goals

  Andrei Ionescu (Aizawl)
  Abdoulaye Koffi (Shillong Lajong)
  Coro (Goa)
  Brandon Fernandes (Goa)

1 goal

  Robbie Keane (ATK)
  Udanta Singh (Bengaluru)
  Rahul Bheke (Bengaluru)
  Maílson Alves (Chennaiyin)
  Dhanachandra Singh (Chennaiyin)
  Willis Plaza (Churchill Brothers)
  Katsumi Yusa (East Bengal)
  Mahmoud Amnah (East Bengal)
  Dudu Omagbemi (East Bengal)
  Laldanmawia Ralte (East Bengal)
  Ansumana Kromah (East Bengal)
  Manvir Singh (Goa)
  Henry Kisekka (Gokulam Kerala)
  Ashim Biswas (Jamshedpur)
  Pulga (Kerala Blasters)
  Prasanth Karuthadathkuni (Kerala Blasters)
  Sheikh Faiaz (Mohun Bagan)
  Nikhil Kadam (Mohun Bagan)
  Akram Moghrabi (Mohun Bagan)
  Achille Emaná (Mumbai City)
  Jean-Michel Joachim (NEROCA)
  Aryn Williams (NEROCA)
  Felix Chidi Odili (NEROCA)
  Pritam Singh (NEROCA)
  Jonatan Lucca (Pune City)
  Marcelinho (Pune City)
  Rakesh Pradhan (Shillong Lajong)
  Samuel Lalmuanpuia (Shillong Lajong)

See also
 2017–18 I-League
 2017–18 Indian Super League season

References

Notes

External links
 Official website
 Super Cup on All India Football Federation website .

 
Super Cup (India) seasons
Super Cup
Indian Super Cup
2018 Asian domestic association football cups